
Year 367 (CCCLXVII) was a common year starting on Monday  of the Julian calendar. At the time, it was known as the Year of the Consulship of Lupicinus and Iovanus (or, less frequently, year 1120 Ab urbe condita). The denomination 367 for this year has been used since the early medieval period, when the Anno Domini calendar era became the prevalent method in Europe for naming years.

Events 
<onlyinclude>

By place

Roman Empire 
 Battle of Solicinium: Emperor Valentinian I launches a punitive expedition against the Alamanni, due to the crises in Britannia and Gaul. The Alamanni re-cross the Rhine and plunder Moguntiacum (modern Mainz). 
 Valentinian I declares that Christians will not be forced into gladiator training schools.
 Great Conspiracy: The Roman garrison on Hadrian's Wall revolts and allows Picts from Caledonia to devastate Britain. Simultaneously Attacotti, the  Scotti from Hibernia (Ireland), and the Saxons from Germania invade the island's mid-western and south-eastern borders. They sack the cities and murder, rape or enslave Romano-British civilians.
 Eunomius of Cyzicus is banished to Mauretania for harbouring the usurper Procopius.
 August 4 – Gratian receives the title of Augustus under his father, Valentinian I.
 Winter – Valentinian I mobilises a massive army for his campaign against the Alamanni and the Franks. He summons the Italian and Illyrian legions for a spring offensive.

Asia 
 The first Korean envoy arrives in Japan, emissary of the government of Kudara.

By topic

Religion 
 First Listing of the New Testament (Bible) by St. Athanasius of Alexandria.
 November 16 – Antipope Ursicinus is banished by the praefecti to Gaul.
 Epiphanius of Salamis becomes bishop of Salamis, Cyprus.
 Emperor Valens is baptized by Eudoxius of Antioch.

Science 
In the region of the constellation Perseus, a star not visible to the naked eye, and 1,533 light years distant from Earth, explodes in a nova.  The light from the star, now called GK Persei, was first detected on Earth on February 21, 1901

Births

Deaths 

 January 13 – Hilary of Poitiers, Byzantine bishop, Doctor of the Church and saint (b. c. 315)

Date unknown 
 Murong Ke, Chinese general and statesman of Former Yan
 Yang Wu (or Shiqiu), Chinese official, general and regent

References